The Crowley's Ridge State Park Dining Hall is a historic recreational facility in Crowley's Ridge State Park, located in Greene County, Arkansas.  Located in the employee area of the park, it is a single-story log structure, built on a fieldstone foundation, and is covered with a gable roof.  It was intended to serve as a kitchen and dining venue serving both park visitors and staff.  It was built  by a crew from the Civilian Conservation Corps, and is an excellent local example of the Rustic style architecture popularized by the CCC.

The building was listed on the National Register of Historic Places in 1992.

See also
National Register of Historic Places listings in Greene County, Arkansas

References

Buildings and structures in Greene County, Arkansas
Crowley's Ridge
Government buildings completed in 1935
Log buildings and structures on the National Register of Historic Places in Arkansas
Park buildings and structures on the National Register of Historic Places in Arkansas
National Register of Historic Places in Greene County, Arkansas
1935 establishments in Arkansas
Civilian Conservation Corps in Arkansas
Rustic architecture in Arkansas